The 2011 Ankara Cup was a professional tennis tournament played on indoor hard courts. It was the first edition of the tournament which was part of the 2011 ITF Women's Circuit. It took place in Ankara, Turkey on 19–24 December 2011.

WTA entrants

Seeds 

 1 Rankings are as of 12 December 2011

Other entrants 
The following players received wildcards into the singles main draw:
  Başak Eraydın
  Sultan Gönen
  Naz Karagöz
  İpek Soylu

The following players received entry from the qualifying draw:
  Laura-Ioana Andrei
  Oksana Kalashnikova
  Marina Melnikova
  Ekaterina Yashina

The following players received entry by a lucky loser spot:
  Ekaterine Gorgodze
  Polina Pekhova

The following player received entry by a Special Ranking spot:
  Katalin Marosi

Champions

Singles 

  Kristina Mladenovic def.  Valeria Savinykh, 7–5, 5–7, 6–1

Doubles 

  Nina Bratchikova /  Darija Jurak def.  Janette Husárová /  Katalin Marosi, 6–4, 6–2

External links
 Official website
 2011 Ankara Cup at ITFtennis.com

Ankara Cup
Ankara Cup
2011 in Turkish tennis
December 2011 sports events in Turkey